Manilal Dand is a former businessman who has set up and runs a library for underprivileged children in Mazgaon, Mumbai. Manilal used to work for the Chacha Nehru Toy library in Bandra. When the library closed, he converted his former spice factory in Mazgaon into a children's library.

References

External links
 Article on Manilal in Hindu Vivek Kendra

Indian philanthropists
Living people
Year of birth missing (living people)
Businesspeople from Mumbai